Raziel Reid is a Canadian writer, whose debut young adult novel When Everything Feels Like the Movies won the Governor General's Award for English-language children's literature at the 2014 Governor General's Awards. The novel, inspired in part by the 2008 murder of gay teenager Lawrence Fobes King, was published by Arsenal Pulp Press in 2014. Its launch was marked with a national book tour with Vivek Shraya, who was simultaneously promoting her new book She of the Mountains.

Reid is a former blogger and columnist for Xtra Vancouver.

When Everything Feels Like the Movies was selected for inclusion in the 2015 edition of Canada Reads, where it was defended by blogger and broadcaster Elaine Lui. It was also nominated for a Lambda Literary Award for LGBT Children's/Young Adult Literature at the 27th Lambda Literary Awards, and for Publishing Triangle's Ferro-Grumley Award.

Works
When Everything Feels Like the Movies (2014)
 Kens Penguin Random House Canada, Toronto 2018
 Followers Penguin Random House Canada, Toronto 2020

References

Writers from Vancouver
Living people
1990 births
21st-century Canadian novelists
Canadian bloggers
Canadian columnists
Canadian women columnists
Canadian male novelists
Canadian writers of young adult literature
Canadian LGBT novelists
Canadian gay writers
Canadian LGBT journalists
Governor General's Award-winning children's writers
21st-century Canadian male writers
Canadian male non-fiction writers
Male bloggers
Gay novelists
21st-century Canadian LGBT people